The Acalyphoideae are a  subfamily within the family Euphorbiaceae with 116 genera in 20 tribes.

See also
 Taxonomy of the Euphorbiaceae

References

 
Rosid subfamilies